Clive Jones (birth unknown) is a Welsh former rugby union and professional rugby league footballer who played in the 1970s, and has coached rugby league.

Playing career

International honours
Clive Jones won caps for Wales (RL) while at Leigh in the 1975 Rugby League World Cup against New Zealand, and France.

Club career
Clive Jones changed rugby football codes from rugby union to rugby league when he transferred from Aberavon RFC to Warrington, he made his début for Warrington on Sunday 20 August 1972, and he played his last match for Warrington on Sunday 15 December 1974, he transferred from Warrington to Leigh, he transferred from Leigh to Oldham, he made his début for Oldham on Sunday 1 April 1979, and he played his last match for Oldham on Sunday 15 April 1979.

References

External links
(archived by web.archive.org) Warrington :: 31 Hull FC :: 20, date: August 1972
(archived by web.archive.org) Statistics at wolvesplayers.thisiswarrington.co.uk

Living people
Aberavon RFC players
Leigh Leopards players
Oldham R.L.F.C. players
Rugby league locks
Wales national rugby league team players
Warrington Wolves players
Welsh rugby league coaches
Welsh rugby league players
Welsh rugby union players
Year of birth missing (living people)